Seta Manoukian (1945) is a Lebanese painter of Armenian descent.

Seta Manoukian was born into a family of Armenian origin in Beirut in 1945. Although she is not part of the generation that experienced the genocide, she belongs to the Armenian diaspora. At seventeen, she won first prize in a art show, consisting of a three month scholarship to Perugia courtesy of the Italian Embassy in Beirut. Later on, she graduated from the accademia Di Belle Arti in Rome. Upon her return, she became a rising figure on the burgeoning Beirut scene. For two decades she created some of the most singular and striking paintings ever seen in Lebanon.

In 1975 the civil war breaks out in Lebanon just as Seta begins teaching at the Lebanese University in Beirut. She starts to teach painting to children in deprived neighborhoods in Beirut, "Lebanese Children And The War" is published by Dar Al Farabi publishers. And "Tache Rouge et Blue", by the League for Lebanese Women's Rights.

In 1985 She moves to Los Angeles, where she continues her work as an artist.

In 2000 she joins a Buddhist Theravada Temple in Los Angeles, and in 2005 is ordained as a Buddhist nun in Sri Lanka. The name Mother Sela is given to her by her teacher Pemasiri Hamdruo. She stays in Sri Lanka In a retreat center for ten month, and in 2006 lives in south India near Bangalore for a year and half.

In 2007 she meets Lama Chodak Gyatso Nubpa Rimpoche from the Nyingma tradition of Tibetan Buddhism in LA. Rimpoche as her root Lama gives her the name Ani Pema Tsultrim Drolma. The retreat center Pema Dawa is in Tehachapi California where she goes very often for retreats till today.

2016 Seta Manoukian as Ani Pema Drolma is ready to paint again after ten years of full devotion to Buddhist teachings and practice.

Work

Seta Manoukian's work consist of paintings, installations and a performance.

Her art has been shown in numerous exhibitions and group shows in Museums around the world.

Videos

2010   "Mother Sela" feature documentary, about the life and work of Seta Manoukian. LA California, produced by Svetlana Darsalia ans Sylvette Artinian:
https://www.youtube.com/watch?v=rWwmTe2dq5I
2008    "Sela Manyo" "Mother Sela", shown at the Arpa international film festival in Los Angeles.
1996    "East of Here..." YYZ artist outlet Toronto, Canada.
1985    "My Father on the Tree" color VHS, UC Berkeley, CA .

Collections

Sursock Museum, Beirut, Lebanon
Saradar Group, Beirut, Lebanon
Cilicia Museum, Antelias, Lebanon
Kuwait Petroleum Corporation
National Museum, Yerevan, Armenia
St Lazare Museum, Venice, Italy
Museum of Mekhitarist Convent, Vienna, Austria

Bibliography

2019   Seta Manoukian,  Kaph books
1999   Dictionnaire de La Peinture Au Liban by Michel Fani, Edition de L'Escalier.
Colette Chattopadhya  Seta Manoukian at Sherry Frumkin Gallery, Art Week Magazine.
1991   "By Way of Beirut" Lisbet Nilson, Los Angeles Times,  March 31
"Seta Manoukian and Missak Terzian" Jodi Garnet, Art Week March 28.
"Balancing Imbalances" Exhibition catalogue, interview by Neery Melkonian, Gallery Casa Sin Nombre, Santa Fe, NM.
"The Artists View: Two Hundred Years of Lebanese Paintings" Quartet books LtD, The British Lebanese association, Beirut, Lebanon.
1986   "The Woman Artists in Lebanon"Helen El Khal, Institute of Woman's studies in the Arabe World, Beirut, Lebanon.French edition.Institut Du Monde Arabe. Paris, France.
1984   "Lebanese Armenian Painting" Seta Dadoyan, Cilicia-Armenian Catholicos, Beirut, Lebanon.
"Vision and Reality:exhibition catalogue, Elissar, Beirut Lebanon.
1982    "'Cent Ans d'Art Plastic Au Liban" Part 1 and 2, Shane Gallery, Beirut, Lebanon.
"About The Lebanese Painting" Salah Stetted Funoon, Arabia Magazine, Beirut, Lebanon.
"Le Portrait A Travers La Peinture Libanaise" Jean Prosper G.Para, Grenier Des Artist, Beirut, Lebanon.

References

Lebanese Buddhists
Armenian Buddhists
Lebanese women artists
20th-century Buddhists
21st-century Buddhists
1945 births
Lebanese artists
21st-century Buddhist nuns
20th-century painters
Living people
Artists from Beirut
Armenian artists
Lebanese people of Armenian descent
Converts to Buddhism from Armenian Apostolic Church